Shadegan County (Ŝahrestāne Ŝādegān) is in Khuzestan province, Iran. The capital of the county is the city of Shadegan. At the 2006 census, the county's population was 138,226 in 23,813 households. The following census in 2011 counted 153,355 people in 34,618 households. At the 2016 census, the county's population was 138,480 in 36,031 households.

Administrative divisions

The population history and structural changes of Shadegan County's administrative divisions over three consecutive censuses are shown in the following table. The latest census shows three districts, nine rural districts, and three cities.

References

 

Counties of Khuzestan Province